Charles Bathgate Beck (1853 – 1893) was a wealthy lawyer who lived in what is now the West Farms section of the Bronx.

He left in his will $300,000 to Columbia University to endow the law school's Charles Bathgate Beck prize.  He also left  $100,000 (equivalent to $150,000,000 in 2021) to The First Presbyterian Church of West Farms for the construction of a new building.

Charles had inherited his estate from his uncle, Alexander Bathgate.  Alexander was not known to have any legitimate children until after his death when his housekeeper, Delia Malloy, claimed to be his wife and the mother of his two children.  The children contested the will.

References 

History of the Bronx
1853 births
1893 deaths
People from the Bronx